Our Lady of Sorrows Church is a historic Roman Catholic church on W. National Avenue in Las Vegas, New Mexico. It was added to the National Register of Historic Places in 1976.

It is a red sandstone building which was started in 1852.  Its interior was not complete until 1885.

See also

National Register of Historic Places listings in San Miguel County, New Mexico

References

External links

Roman Catholic churches completed in 1885
Churches in Las Vegas, New Mexico
Roman Catholic churches in New Mexico
Churches on the National Register of Historic Places in New Mexico
Gothic Revival church buildings in New Mexico
Romanesque Revival architecture in New Mexico
National Register of Historic Places in San Miguel County, New Mexico
1852 establishments in New Mexico Territory
Romanesque Revival church buildings in the United States
19th-century Roman Catholic church buildings in the United States